Lao Holding State Enterprise (LHSE) is a state corporation of Laos that is primarily involved with the financing of the energy industry, including the Nam Theun 2 Power Company, of whose stock it controls 25%.    LHSE is involved with other projects of Laos' energy infrastructure, including Nam Ngum Dam, Nam Ngiep Dam and the Hongsa Lignite Power Plant.  The company is part of the Ministry of Finance.

See also

Government of Laos
Energy in Laos

References

External links
Lao Holding State Enterprise official homepage
Voice of America News, 14 March 2008, 'LHSE to invest in 5 energy projects'
Nam Theun 2 Power Company, 'Organization'

Government of Laos
Electric power companies of Laos
Companies of Laos
Vientiane